Harrison Township is one of the twelve townships of Champaign County, Ohio, United States. As of the 2010 census the population was 932.

Geography
Located in the northwestern part of the county, it borders the following townships:
Union Township, Logan County - north
Liberty Township, Logan County - northeast
Salem Township - east
Concord Township - south
Adams Township - west
Miami Township, Logan County - northwest

No municipalities are located in Harrison Township, although the unincorporated community of Springhills is located in the township's northwest.

Name and history
It is one of nineteen Harrison Townships statewide.

Government
The township is governed by a three-member board of trustees, who are elected in November of odd-numbered years to a four-year term beginning on the following January 1. Two are elected in the year after the presidential election and one is elected in the year before it. There is also an elected township fiscal officer, who serves a four-year term beginning on April 1 of the year after the election, which is held in November of the year before the presidential election. Vacancies in the fiscal officership or on the board of trustees are filled by the remaining trustees.

References

External links
County website
County and township map of Ohio

Townships in Champaign County, Ohio
Townships in Ohio